The Chatra Gorge is a canyon cut by the Kosi River across the Mahabharat Range in Nepal.

Kosi river system
The Kosi, or Sapt Kosi, drains eastern Nepal. It is known as Sapt Koshi because of the seven rivers which join together in east-central Nepal to form this river. The main rivers forming the Kosi system are – the Sun Kosi, the Indravati River, the Bhote Koshi, the Dudh Kosi, the Arun River, Barun River, and Tamur River. The combined river flows through the Chatra gorge in a southerly direction to emerge from the hills.

The Sun Kosi contributes 44 per cent of the total water in the Sapta Koshi, the Arun 37 per cent and the Tamur 19 per cent.

Of the rivers that form the Sapta Kosi, the three main tributaries, Sun Kosi, Arun and Tamur converge 
at Tribeni and enter Chatra Gorge.

The Gorge
The Chatra Gorge is about 10 km long and is about 5–8 km wide. Downstream of the gorge, the river enters the alluvial plains forming a huge megafan covering around 16,000 km2.

Sapta Kosi High Dam
It will have a 3,000 MW power station and a barrage 8 km downstream with canals on both sides for irrigation.

References 

Canyons and gorges of Nepal